Quinag is an 808 m high mountain range in Sutherland in the Scottish Highlands, with an undulating series of peaks along its Y-shaped crest. The name Quinag is an anglicisation of the Gaelic name Cuinneag, a milk pail, reflecting its distinctive shape.

Geologically, Quinag is made of Torridonian sandstone, resting on a substrate of Lewisian gneiss. The highest peaks are capped by a thin skin of Cambrian quartzites with the gentle eastern slope of Spidean Coinich being a dip slope formed along the quartzite beds. The massif is an excellent place to appreciate the relationship between these three major rock units of the NW Highland.

Ascent
Quinag boasts three separate Corbett summits – Sàil Ghorm (Blue Heel), Sàil Gharbh (Rough Heel) and Spidean Coinich (Mossy Peak). From the north and from the road crossing the Kylesku Bridge, Quinag presents a formidable sight with its two huge buttresses of Sàil Gharbh and Sàil Ghorm dominating the skyline. It provides a backdrop to Loch Assynt, and seen from the road coming from the village of Lochinver, Quinag stretches as far as the eye can see. Spidean Coinich projects a broad south-east ridge which provides the usual ascent route for walkers.

The  Quinag estate was purchased by the John Muir Trust in 2005. Quinag and Glencanisp estates share ownership of Loch Assynt.

Remnants of ancient woodland comprising birch, rowan, hazel, wych elm, aspen and oak are scattered throughout the northern side of the mountain particularly in the deep gulleys and sheltered situations near the seashore.

Quinag is mentioned in Iain Banks's 2007 novel The Steep Approach to Garbadale as lying just west of the estate of that name.

See also
 Geology of Scotland

References

External links
 John Muir Trust

Corbetts
Mountains and hills of the Northwest Highlands
Marilyns of Scotland
Landforms of Sutherland
Protected areas of Highland (council area)
Mountains and hills of Highland (council area)